Phtheochroa vulneratana is a species of moth of the family Tortricidae. It is found in Italy, Austria, Switzerland, Fennoscandia, Russia (Alai, Sajan, Irkutsk, Amur, Kamchatka, Transbaikal), the Pamir Mountains and Mongolia. It is also found in North America (from Alaska to British Columbia and south to Colorado) and Japan (Hokkaido, Honshu). The species is found in Arctic-alpine habitats.

The wingspan is 21–24 mm. Adults have been recorded on wing from June to August.

References

Moths described in 1839
Phtheochroa
Moths of Europe
Taxa named by Johan Wilhelm Zetterstedt